Newtown station may refer to:

 Newtown railway station, Sydney
 Newtown railway station (Wales), in Powys, Wales
 New Mills Newtown railway station, Derbyshire, England
 Newtown station (SEPTA), Newtown, Pennsylvania, USA